is a former Nippon Professional Baseball player who retired after the 2013 season. Maeda's career spanned 24 seasons, all spent with the Hiroshima Toyo Carp in Japan's Central League. He played in one Japan Series, batting .158 with a triple and two stolen bases in a 7-game loss against the Seibu Lions in 1991.

Some of his career accomplishments include:

200 home runs (295)
2000 games played (2188)
7000 at bats (7008)
2000 hits (2119) 
900 runs (929)
1100 runs batted in (1112)
300 doubles (353)
3000 total bases (3391)
500 walks (586)
.300 batting average (.302)

See also
Nippon Professional Baseball Comeback Player of the Year Award

External links

THE GOLDEN PLAYERS CLUB (Japanese)
Carp veteran Maeda to retire

1971 births
Living people
Baseball people from Kumamoto Prefecture
Japanese baseball players
Nippon Professional Baseball outfielders
Hiroshima Toyo Carp players